The Plane is a river in Brandenburg, Germany, left tributary of the Havel. The Plane originates in the High Fläming Nature Park, near Rabenstein. It flows north through Planetal and Golzow. The Plane joins the Havel in the Breitlingsee lake west of Brandenburg an der Havel.

Rivers of Brandenburg
Rivers of Germany